Mastchoh District or Nohiya-i Mastchoh (Nohiya‘i Mastçoh/Nohijaji Mastcoh) is a district in Sughd Region, Tajikistan. It is located at the extreme north of the country, between Ghafurov district and the border with Uzbekistan. The district population is 128,400 (1 January 2020 est.) and its administrative capital is Buston.

Administrative divisions
They are as follows:

References

Districts of Tajikistan
Sughd Region